The 1949 Chicago White Sox season was the White Sox's 49th season in the major leagues, and their 50th season overall. They finished with a record  of 63–91, good enough for 6th place in the American League, 34 games behind the first place New York Yankees.

Offseason 
 November 10, 1948: Tod Davis was drafted from the White Sox by the Philadelphia Athletics in the 1948 rule 5 draft.

Regular season 
The 1949 White Sox were the last American League team in the 20th century to hit more triples than home runs. The club had 66 triples compared to 43 home runs.

Season standings

Record vs. opponents

Opening Day lineup 
 Floyd Baker, 3B
 Dave Philley, CF
 Luke Appling, SS
 Gus Zernial, LF
 Pat Seerey, RF
 Cass Michaels, 2B
 Steve Souchock, 1B
 Joe Tipton, C
 Al Gettel, P

Notable transactions 
 June 2, 1949: Jerry Scala, a player to be named later, and cash were traded by the White Sox to the Oakland Oaks for Catfish Metkovich. The Oaks returned Jerry Scala to the White Sox on June 11, and the Chicago White Sox sent Earl Rapp to the Oaks to complete the trade.
 September 13, 1949: Jack Bruner was signed as an amateur free agent by the White Sox.

Roster

Player stats

Batting 
Note: G = Games played; AB = At bats; R = Runs scored; H = Hits; 2B = Doubles; 3B = Triples; HR = Home runs; RBI = Runs batted in; BB = Base on balls; SO = Strikeouts; AVG = Batting average; SB = Stolen bases

Pitching 
Note: W = Wins; L = Losses; ERA = Earned run average; G = Games pitched; GS = Games started; SV = Saves; IP = Innings pitched; H = Hits allowed; R = Runs allowed; ER = Earned runs allowed; HR = Home runs allowed; BB = Walks allowed; K = Strikeouts

Farm system

Notes

References 
 1949 Chicago White Sox at Baseball Reference

Chicago White Sox seasons
Chicago White Sox season
Chicago White